David Gomberg (born June 9, 1953) is a Democratic member of the Oregon House of Representatives, representing District 10 on the state's central coast since January 14, 2013. He served in political staff and lobbying positions in Oregon prior to his election to the Legislature. He's  the retired head of his own kite design and construction business.

Education
Gomberg earned his bachelor's degree in political science from Oregon State University in 1976 when he also served as student body president. In 1977, he earned a master's degree from Oregon State University in Political Science, Economics, and History. In 1981, Gomberg earned an MBA from Willamette University's Atkinson Graduate School of Management.

Early life

David Gomberg was born in 1953, in London, England, the son of a US Air Force officer and his British wife. He graduated from Hiram Johnson High School in Sacramento California in 1971.

Gomberg moved to Oregon and enrolled at Oregon State University. He earned a bachelor's degree in political science, with Honors, in 1976, served as student body president, and earned an Interdisciplinary master's degree in Political Science, History, and Economics in 1977.

In 1978, Gomberg worked for US Congressman Les AuCoin in Washington D.C. and Portland, Oregon. He then attended Willamette University in Salem, Oregon, earning an MBA in 1981.

In 1981 and 1983, Gomberg worked in the Oregon Legislative Assembly as a Chief-of-Staff to freshman legislator Barbara Roberts and then as administrator of the House Education Committee. He then spent three years as an Administrative Hearings Referee for the Department of Motor Vehicles, a position he lost when he declined to cross a public employee picket line.

David Gomberg married Susan Elizabeth Oswald in 1986.

In 1988, the Gombergs moved to the Oregon Coast where David worked as executive director of the Lincoln City Chamber of Commerce. He left that position two years later to focus on his growing kite business.

Kites

Gomberg Kite Productions International (GKPI) was a design and manufacturing, wholesale, and retail business. They operated three web pages and three Northwest Winds retail stores. Their company produced large inflatable kites and custom line decor for retail customers and select wholesale accounts. GKPI also produced a quality series of introductory kites and accessories under the G-Kites brand.

Gomberg has authored four books on kite flying. He served ten terms as president of the American Kitefliers Association (AKA) and four terms as president of the Kite Trade Association International (KTAI). Both organizations recognized Gomberg with their lifetime achievement awards and in 2005, Gomberg was inducted in the World Kiting Hall of Fame.

In 2012, GKPI was named Business of the Year in Lincoln City, Oregon. They have also been finalists twice for the Austin Excellence in Family Business awards.

GKPI also specialized in performances with larger show kites. David and Susan have flown in more than 40 countries and done shows for Walt Disney, motion pictures, and the Super Bowl. David has been named an honorary citizen of Weifang, China and Berck, France, and is a patron of the Cape Mental Health Kite Festival in South Africa.

In 2005, GKPI acquired a  kite, one of the largest kites in the world.

During 2018–2019, David ramped down and closed GKPI in order to focus on his political career and other personal interests. Some of the smaller Gomberg designs were taken over by other kite manufacturers and are still available today.

Political life
In 2012, David was elected to represent House District 10 in the Oregon Legislature. The district includes portions of Lincoln, Tillamook, Yamhill, and Polk counties, stretching over 100 miles of the central coast and inland 50 miles through the Coast Range. His legislative efforts have focused on small business support, reviving our public education system, collecting delinquent state taxes and debt, environmental sustainability and conservation, and ensuring independence and dignity for seniors and the disabled.

When Democratic Representative Jean Cowan retired and left the District 10 seat open, Gomberg was unopposed for the May 15, 2012 Democratic Primary, winning with 5,006 votes, and won the November 6, 2012 General election with 15,978 votes (59.1%) against Republican nominee Jerome Grant.

David Gomberg was unopposed in his 2014 re-election bid, having earned nominations of the Democrat, Independent, Working Families, and Republican parties. In 2015, Gomberg was elected to House Leadership as Assistant Majority Leader. In 2016, he was elected to a third term, defeating Republican Thomas Donohue by 56 to 43 percent.

David currently serves on the Joint Ways & Means Committee, serves as co-chair for the Ways & Means Transportation & Economic Development subcommittee, sits on the Ways & Means General Government subcommittee, and serves on the House Economic Development and Trade committee. He is a member of the Governor's Commission on Senior Services and the Ocean Science Trust.

In 2016, David was asked to co-chair the House Special Committee on Small Business Growth and was appointed to the Governor's Cabinet on Small Business.

Committee assignments 

2017-18 Session

 Joint Committee on Ways and Means 
 Co-chair: Ways and Means sub-Committee on Transportation and Economic Development 
 Ways and Means sub-Committee on General Government
 House Committee on Economic Development and Trade
 Governor's Commission on Senior Services
 Ocean Science Trust

2015-16 Session

 Joint Committee on Ways and Means 
 Co-chair: Ways and Means sub-Committee on Transportation and Economic Development 
 Ways and Means sub-Committee on Natural Resources
 House Committee on Rural Communities, Land Use, and Water
 Co-chair: House Special Committee on Small Business Growth
 Governor's Commission on Senior Services
 Governor's Small Business Cabinet
 Ocean Science Trust

2013-14 Session

 Vice Chair: House Committee on Human Service and Housing
 House Committee on Education
 Joint Ways and Means Subcommittee on General Government
 House Small Business Task Force
 Governor's Commission on Senior Services

References

External links
 Official page at the Oregon Legislative Assembly
 Campaign site

Place of birth missing (living people)
Living people
Democratic Party members of the Oregon House of Representatives
Oregon State University alumni
People from Lincoln County, Oregon
Willamette University alumni
1953 births
21st-century American politicians